Guram Giorbelidze (born 25 February 1996) is a Georgian professional footballer who plays as a left-back for Dinamo Batumi, on loan from Zagłębie Lubin, and the Georgia national team.

Club career
After spells at Sioni Bolnisi and Dila Gori in his home country, Giorbelidze joined Austrian Football Bundesliga side Wolfsberger AC in July 2020, signing a two-year contract with an option of an additional year. On 29 November 2020, he made his professional league debut for Wolfsberger AC, as a substitute in a 1–1 draw with Ried.

On 17 July 2022, he joined Polish Ekstraklasa side Zagłębie Lubin on a two-year deal. Giorbelidze quickly earned a spot in the starting line-up and made 15 league appearances for Zagłębie in the first half of the season. Following Piotr Stokowiec's dismissal, Giorbelidze was deemed surplus to requirements by the new manager Waldemar Fornalik. On 22 February 2023, he sent on loan to Dinamo Batumi until the end of the season.

International career
After first being called up in October 2017, Giorbelidze made his debut for Georgia U21s in October 2018. He debuted with the Georgia national team in a 1–0 2022 FIFA World Cup qualification loss to Sweden on 25 March 2021.

References

External links

1996 births
Living people
Footballers from Georgia (country)
Georgia (country) international footballers
Georgia (country) under-21 international footballers
Association football defenders
FC Sioni Bolnisi players
FC Dila Gori players
Wolfsberger AC players
Dynamo Dresden players
Zagłębie Lubin players
FC Dinamo Batumi players
Erovnuli Liga players
Erovnuli Liga 2 players
Austrian Football Bundesliga players
Ekstraklasa players
Expatriate footballers from Georgia (country)
Expatriate sportspeople from Georgia (country) in Austria
Expatriate footballers in Austria
Expatriate sportspeople from Georgia (country) in Germany
Expatriate footballers in Germany
Expatriate sportspeople from Georgia (country) in Poland
Expatriate footballers in Poland